A list of films produced in Argentina in 1933:

1933
Films
Argentine